Sabrin may refer to the following people
Given name
Sabrin Saka Meem, Bangladeshi actress and television news presenter
Sabrin Sburlea (born 1989), Romanian football forward 

Surname
Murray Sabrin (born 1946), American economist 
Sarika Sabrin (born 1992), Bangladeshi actress and model